Gunnar Bergström (7 May 1915 – 18 March 1968) was a Swedish footballer. He played in ten matches for the Sweden national football team from 1937 to 1939. He was also named in Sweden's squad for the Group 1 qualification tournament for the 1938 FIFA World Cup.

References

1915 births
1968 deaths
Swedish footballers
Sweden international footballers
Place of birth missing
Association football forwards
IK Brage players